Miss Supranational USA, also referred to as Miss Supranational United States, is an annual beauty pageant in the United States that is held to select the representative of the United States of America at Miss Supranational.

The current Miss Supranational USA is Shivali Patel of North Carolina.

Titleholders

States by number of wins

Representatives at Miss Supranational

References

External links
Official Website

USA
2011 establishments in the United States
Recurring events established in 2011
Beauty pageants in the United States